Sabanalarga could may refer to the following places in Colombia:

Sabanalarga, Antioquia
Sabanalarga, Atlántico
Sabanalarga, Casanare